Donald A. Oakie was an American bridge player.

Bridge accomplishments

Wins

 Bermuda Bowl (1) 1954 
 North American Bridge Championships (4)
 Barclay Trophy (1) 1952 
 Mitchell Board-a-Match Teams (1) 1957 
 Reisinger (1) 1959 
 Spingold (1) 1953

Runners-up

Notes

American contract bridge players
Bermuda Bowl players